Jason Gavadza (born January 31, 1976 in Toronto, Ontario) is a former National Football League (NFL) tight end and Super Bowl champion as a member of the Baltimore Ravens, and also played in the Canadian Football League (CFL) as a fullback for the Toronto Argonauts, Montreal Allouettes, and BC Lions.

He graduated from Michael Power/St. Joseph High School, and from Kent State University. Drafted as tight end in the 2000 NFL Draft in the sixth round, he was a member of the Pittsburgh Steelers, Tennessee Titans, Carolina Panthers, Green Bay Packers, Baltimore Ravens, St. Louis Rams, Cincinnati Bengals and won the Super Bowl championship in 2000 as a member of the Baltimore Ravens of the NFL.

References 

BC Lions players
Canadian football fullbacks
Players of Canadian football from Ontario
Sportspeople from Toronto
Canadian football people from Toronto
Toronto Argonauts players
Kent State University alumni
1976 births
Living people
Pittsburgh Steelers players